Ballacraine Halt (Manx: Stadd Valley Craine) was an infrequent request stop on the Isle of Man Railway.

Origins

Originally opened in 1876 the halt provided a stopping place for the short walk to Glen Helen until 1879. Later in 1927 the halt was used again mainly by spectators attending the TT Races at Ballacraine.

Closure

The Douglas to Peel line closed in 1968 but this location ceased to be a halt in 1929; up until this time it featured infrequently in timetable literature and was only used as a somewhat unofficial drop-of point for spectators viewing the T.T. road races.

The site today
The Steam Heritage Trail now passes through the site, and the former crossing keepers' lodge has been retained, now forming a shelter for walkers.

References

 
 Station on navigable O.S. map Road junction south of Ballacraine village marked as Scravorley

See also
 Isle of Man Railway stations
 Ballacraine Halt on Subterranea

Railway stations in the Isle of Man
Railway stations opened in 1876
Railway stations closed in 1879